Geoffroy Messina is a French rugby union footballer, born on 29 May 1982 in La Tronche, Isère.
He currently plays in the centre position. Messina started his career with FC Grenoble in 2001, and stayed with them for 2 years. At the end of 2002 he changed teams to play for ASM Clermont, where he stayed until 2005. Since then he has played for Stade Français Paris. Messina earned the title of Champion de France 2007. Messina also models on the side. He has appeared in the popular Dieux du Stade calendar since 2005.

References 

1982 births
Living people
Sportspeople from La Tronche
French rugby union players
Rugby union centres
FC Grenoble players
ASM Clermont Auvergne players
Stade Français players
RC Toulonnais players